The LPGA Taiwan Championship is a women's professional golf tournament in Taiwan on the LPGA Tour. It debuted as the Sunrise LPGA Taiwan Championship in 2011 at the Sunrise Golf & Country Club in Yangmei. It was the first LPGA tournament ever played in Taiwan. It moved to Miramar Golf Country Club in Taipei and was renamed to the Fubon LPGA Taiwan Championship in 2014.

The field is limited to 90 players who will play all 72 holes; however, there is a cut for LPGA season-long points championship purposes at the end of 72 holes of the top 40 and ties. Only the players who make this cut will earn points to qualify for the season-ending CME Group Tour Championship.

Tournament names:
2011–2013: Sunrise LPGA Taiwan Championship
2014–2016: Fubon LPGA Taiwan Championship
2017–2018: Swinging Skirts LPGA Taiwan Championship
2019–2022: Taiwan Swinging Skirts LPGA

Host courses:
2011–2013: Sunrise Golf & Country Club
2014–2019: Miramar Golf Country Club

Winners

Tournament record

See also
 List of sporting events in Taiwan

References

External links

Coverage on LPGA's official site
Sunrise Golf and Country Club

LPGA Tour events
Golf tournaments in Taiwan
Recurring sporting events established in 2011
2011 establishments in Taiwan
Autumn events in Taiwan